Joseph Marchand (18 June 1892 – 18 January 1935) was a Belgian racing cyclist. He rode in the 1922 Tour de France.

References

1892 births
1935 deaths
Belgian male cyclists
Place of birth missing